Pterostylis lingua, commonly known as the large-lipped rustyhood, is a plant in the orchid family Orchidaceae and is endemic to south-eastern Australia. It has a rosette of leaves and up to ten dark reddish-brown flowers with translucent "windows" and a blackish, insect-like labellum.

Description
Pterostylis lingua, is a terrestrial,  perennial, deciduous, herb with an underground tuber. Four to seven stem leaves are wrapped around the flowering spike. The thickened "head" end has many short hairs and the "body" has seven to ten longer hairs on each side. Flowering occurs from September to October.

Taxonomy and naming
Pterostylis lingua was first formally described in 1989 by Mark Clements from a specimen collected in the Cocoparra National Park and the description was published in Australian Orchid Research. The specific epithet (lingua) is a Latin word meaning "tongue".

Distribution and habitat
The large-lipped rustyhood grows in drier forest and woodland and is locally common between Cootamundra and Bourke New South Wales.  In South Australia it only occurs in the Eastern Bioregion and in Victoria, only in the far north-western corner of that state.

Conservation
Only about 1500 plants of Pterostylis lingua are known in Victoria, where the species is classed as "endangered" and it is also considered to be "endangered" in South Australia.

References

lingua
Endemic orchids of Australia
Orchids of Victoria (Australia)
Plants described in 1989